Te Awa is a Māori term, translating as the river.

It may refer to:
 Te Awa, Canterbury, a locality in Canterbury, New Zealand
 Te Awa, Napier, a suburb of Napier, New Zealand
 Te Awa (shopping centre), a shopping centre in Hamilton, New Zealand

See also
 River (disambiguation)
 The River (disambiguation)